The Bogoliubov inner product (also known as the Duhamel two-point function, Bogolyubov inner product, Bogoliubov scalar product, or Kubo–Mori–Bogoliubov inner product) is a special inner product in the space of operators. The Bogoliubov inner product appears in quantum statistical mechanics and is named after theoretical physicist Nikolay Bogoliubov.

Definition
Let  be a self-adjoint operator. The Bogoliubov inner product of any two operators X and Y is defined as

With these notations, the Bogoliubov inner product takes the form

where  denotes the thermal average with respect to the Hamiltonian  and inverse temperature .

In quantum statistical mechanics, the Bogoliubov inner product appears as the second order term in the expansion of the statistical sum:

References

Quantum mechanics
Statistical mechanics